CyberFight Festival is an annual Japanese professional wrestling event promoted by CyberFight. The event has been held since 2021 and aired worldwide on CyberFight's streaming service Wrestle Universe. The event is usually held in June and features all four brands under the CyberFight umbrella: DDT Pro-Wrestling (DDT), Pro Wrestling Noah, Tokyo Joshi Pro Wrestling (TJPW) and Ganbare☆Pro-Wrestling (GanPro).

Events

References

External links
The official CyberFight website

 
Professional wrestling joint events
DDT Pro-Wrestling shows
Pro Wrestling Noah shows
Tokyo Joshi Pro-Wrestling